William Ralph Inge  (6 June 1860 – 26 February 1954) was an English author, Anglican priest, professor of divinity at Cambridge, and dean of St Paul's Cathedral, which provided the appellation by which he was widely known, Dean Inge. He was nominated for the Nobel Prize in Literature three times.

Early life and education 

He was born on 6 June 1860 in Crayke, Yorkshire. His father was William Inge, Provost of Worcester College, Oxford, and his mother Susanna Churton, daughter of Edward Churton, Archdeacon of Cleveland. Inge was educated at Eton College, where he was a King's Scholar and won the Newcastle Scholarship in 1879, and at King's College, Cambridge, where he won a number of prizes, as well as taking firsts in both parts of the Classical Tripos.

Career

Positions held
He was a tutor at Hertford College, Oxford, starting in 1888, the year he was ordained as a deacon in the Church of England.

His only parochial position was as vicar of All Saints, Knightsbridge, London, from 1905 to 1907.

In 1907, he moved to Jesus College, Cambridge, on being appointed Lady Margaret's Professor of Divinity.

In 1911, he became dean of St. Paul's Cathedral in London. He served as president of the Aristotelian Society at Cambridge from 1920 to 1921.

He had retired from full-time church ministry in 1934.

Inge was also a trustee of London's National Portrait Gallery from 1921 until 1951.

Writing
Inge was a prolific author. In addition to scores of articles, lectures and sermons, he also wrote over 35 books. Inge was a columnist for the Evening Standard for many years, finishing in 1946.

He is best known for his works on Plotinus and neoplatonic philosophy, and on Christian mysticism, but also wrote on general topics of life, and current politics.

He was nominated for the Nobel Prize in Literature three times.

Views 

Inge was a strong proponent of the spiritual type of religion—"that autonomous faith which rests upon experience and individual inspiration"—as opposed to one of coercive authority. He was therefore outspoken in his criticisms of the Roman Catholic Church. His thought, on the whole, represents a blending of traditional Christian theology with elements of Platonic philosophy. He shares this in common with one of his favourite writers, Benjamin Whichcote, the first of the Cambridge Platonists.

He was nicknamed The Gloomy Dean because of his pessimistic views in his Romanes Lecture of 1920, "The Idea of Progress" and in his Evening Standard articles. In his Romanes Lecture he said that although mankind's accumulated experience and wonderful discoveries had great value, they did not constitute real progress in human nature itself.

He disapproved of democracy, which he called "an absurdity" and compared it to "the famous occasion when the voice of the people cried, Crucify Him!" He wrote "Human beings are born unequal, and the only persons who have a right to govern their neighbours are those who are competent to do so." He advanced various arguments why women should have fewer voting rights than men, if any.

He was also a eugenicist and wrote considerably on the subject. In his book Outspoken Essays, he devotes an entire chapter to this subject. His views included that the state should decide which couples be allowed to have children.

Inge opposed social welfare "on the grounds that it penalized the successful while subsidizing the weak and feckless".

He was also known for his support for nudism. He supported the publishing of Maurice Parmelee's book, The New Gymnosophy: Nudity and the Modern Life, and was critical of town councillors who were insisting that bathers wear full bathing costumes.

He was a supporter of animal rights.

Recognition 
He was made a Commander of the Victorian Order (CVO) in 1918 and promoted to Knight Commander (KCVO) in 1930. He received Honorary Doctorates of Divinity from both Oxford and Aberdeen Universities, Honorary Doctorates of Literature from both Durham and Sheffield, and Honorary Doctorates of Laws from both Edinburgh and St. Andrews. He was also an honorary fellow of both King's and Jesus Colleges at Cambridge, and of Hertford College at Oxford. In 1921, he was elected as a Fellow of the British Academy.

Personal life 

Inge's wife, Mary Catharine, was the daughter of priest Henry Maxwell Spooner. They had three children. Their daughter, Paula, developed type 1 diabetes before insulin was widely available in the UK and died in 1923, aged 11. In 1941, their youngest son, Richard, also in the ministry, died during an RAF training flight. 

Inge's wife died in 1949.

Inge spent his later life at Brightwell Manor in Brightwell-cum-Sotwell, Oxfordshire, where he died on 26 February 1954, aged 93, five years after his wife.

Publications 
The following bibliography is a selection taken mainly from Adam Fox's biography Dean Inge and his biographical sketch in Crockford's Clerical Directory.

 Society in Rome under the Caesars 1888
 Eton Latin Grammar 1888
 Christian Mysticism (Bampton Lectures) 1899
 Faith 1900
 Contentio Veritatis Essays in Constructive Theology by Six Oxford Tutors (two essays) 1902
 Faith and Knowledge: Sermons 1904
 Light, Life and Love (Selections from the German mystics of the Middle Ages) 1904 also online at Project Gutenberg and CCEL
 Studies of English Mystics 1905
 Truth and Falsehood in Religion (Cambridge Lectures 1906
 Personal Idealism and Mysticism (Paddock Lectures) 1906
 All Saints' Sermons 1907
 Faith and its Psychology (Jowett Lectures) 1909 
 Speculum Animae 1911
 The Church and the Age 1912
 The Religious Philosophy of Plotinus and some Modern Philosophies of Religion 1914
 Types of Christian Saintliness 1915
 Christian Mysticism, considered in eight lectures delivered before the University of Oxford (1918)
 The Philosophy of Plotinus (Gifford Lectures) 1918. Online: Volume 1 Volume 2 Print versions:  (softcover),  (hardcover)
 Outspoken Essays I 1919 & II 1922
 
 The Victorian Age: the Rede Lecture for 1922 1922 
 Assessments and Anticipations 1922 (2nd ed. 1929)
 Personal Religion and the Life of Devotion 1924
 Lay Thoughts of a Dean 1926
 The Platonic Tradition in English Religious Thought Hulsean Lectures 1926 
 The Church in the World 1927
 Protestantism (London: Ernest Benn Limited, 1927)
 Christian Ethics and Modern Problems 1930
 
 Things New and Old 1933
 God and the Astronomers 1933
The Post Victorians 1933 (Introduction only)
 Vale 1934
 The Gate of Life 1935
 A Rustic Moralist 1937
 Our Present Discontents 1938 
 A Pacifist in Trouble 1939 
 The Fall of the Idols 1940
 Talks in a Free Country 1942 
 Mysticism in Religion 1947 
 The End of an Age and Other Essays 1948
 Diary of a Dean 1949
 The Things That Remain edited by W R Matthews 1958

References

Footnotes

Sources

Further reading

External links

 
 Bibliographic directory from Project Canterbury
 
 
 
 William Ralph Inge biographical notes and Lectures available from the Gifford Lectures website 
 

 Recording of Inge speaking

1860 births
1954 deaths
19th-century Christian mystics
20th-century Christian mystics
Alumni of King's College, Cambridge
Deans of St Paul's
English Anglicans
Fellows of Hertford College, Oxford
Fellows of Jesus College, Cambridge
Knights Commander of the Royal Victorian Order
Lady Margaret's Professors of Divinity
People educated at Eton College
People from Brightwell-cum-Sotwell
People from Hambleton District
Presidents of the Aristotelian Society
Protestant mystics
Social nudity advocates
English eugenicists
Presidents of the Classical Association